BYA may refer to:

 Black-Yellow Alliance, a monarchist movement in Austria
 Brigham Young Academy, an American school
 bya, a unit of time
 BYA (airline), an American charter airline
 BYA (railway station), a railway station serving the remote settlement of Berney Arms in the English county of Norfolk